"Words of Love" is a song written by Buddy Holly and released as a single in 1957.

Original version
Holly recorded the song on April 8, 1957. Holly harmonized with himself, by combining tape recordings of each part. The song was not a notable hit for Holly, although it is regarded as one of his important recordings and is available in most standard Holly collections.

A compilation album, Words of Love, released by PolyGram in the UK in 1993, reached number 1 and was certified as a gold record.

The Diamonds version

A doo-wop version by the Diamonds, released by Mercury Records on May 20, 1957, reached number thirteen on the Billboard Hot 100 in July 1957, making the song Holly's first hit, though as a composer not performer. The Diamonds also performed the song live on the ABC television show Circus Time on June 27, 1957, and included it on the 1962 Mercury LP album Pop Hits (MGW 12178).

The Beatles' version

The Beatles recorded a cover version of the song on October 18, 1964 for the UK album Beatles for Sale. It first appeared in the U.S. on the album Beatles VI. It was also on a 7-inch extended play, Beatles for Sale No. 2, released by Parlophone/EMI in 1965. John Lennon and Paul McCartney, who were fans of Holly, sang in harmony with George Harrison, holding to the vocal and instrumental sound of Holly's original as well as they could. Before their big break, the group had performed the song live between 1958 and 1962, with Lennon and Harrison singing. For the official release, though, Lennon and McCartney shared vocal duties. The song only took two takes, along with a vocal overdub.

Personnel
John Lennon – lead vocals, rhythm guitar
Paul McCartney – lead vocals, bass
George Harrison – harmony vocals, double-tracked lead guitar
Ringo Starr – drums, packing case
Personnel according to Ian MacDonald

Other recordings
A 1963 Beatles performance of "Words of Love" recorded for BBC broadcast is included on the 2013 compilation album On Air – Live at the BBC Volume 2. The recording was also included on a five-song promotional EP from the album, and on a DVD or Blu-ray included with the 2015 album 1+.

Other cover versions
 Jessica Lea Mayfield recorded a cover version of the song for the Starbucks compilation Sweetheart: Our Favorite Artists Sing Their Favorite Love Songs.
Paul McCartney recorded a version in 1985 on acoustic guitar. His version was featured in the documentary The Real Buddy Holly Story.
 Pat DiNizio covered the song for his tribute CD, Pat DiNizio/Buddy Holly, in 2009.
 The power pop band Shoes covered the song for the 1989 Buddy Holly tribute album Everyday Is a Holly Day.
Jimmy Gilmer and the Fireballs released a recording of the song in 1964 on the album Buddy's Buddy.
 Mike Berry recorded the song in 1999 for the tribute album Buddy—A Life in Music, released on the Hallmark label.
 The Pete Best Band recorded the song in 1999.
 Jeremy Jay recorded the song in 2009.
 Patti Smith's cover of the song is featured on the 2011 release Rave on Buddy Holly, a tribute album featuring performances of Holly's music by various artists.
Jeff Lynne contributed a cover version to the tribute album Listen to Me: Buddy Holly, released in 2011.

References

1957 songs
1957 singles
Buddy Holly songs
The Beatles songs
The Diamonds songs
Jangle pop songs
Music published by MPL Music Publishing
Song recordings produced by George Martin
Songs written by Buddy Holly
1950s ballads
it:Words of Love